Holly Kathleen Palance (born August 5, 1950) is an American former actress and journalist. She is perhaps best known for her role as the nanny of Damien Thorn in Richard Donner's The Omen (1976). Palance also appeared in Pete Walker's horror film The Comeback (1978). Beginning in 1984, she also co-hosted the series Ripley's Believe it or Not! with her father, Jack Palance.

Palance also had a leading role opposite Robin Williams and Kurt Russell in the comedy The Best of Times (1986) before retiring from acting. She later shifted to a career in journalism, serving as the editor-in-chief of the Los Angeles Timess lifestyle magazine.

Early years
Holly Kathleen Palance was born on August 5, 1950 in Los Angeles, California. She is the daughter of actor Jack Palance and his wife Virginia Baker. Holly was the first of three children born to the couple. She is of Ukrainian descent. Palance spent her early life in Los Angeles before relocating with her father to Europe in 1957, where she lived in several European countries over the next seven years, including Switzerland, Italy, and Germany.

Career 
At age 19, Palance enrolled in a three-year acting program in London. Before appearing onscreen, Palance performed in theater in England beginning in 1971, appearing in productions at the Oxford Playhouse and in London's West End. She continued to work primarily in England for the remainder of the decade.

Palance played Lois Lane opposite Christopher Reeve in his screen test for the title role in Superman (1978). The tests included scenes from the balcony interview in Superman and the Niagara Falls hotel room scene from Superman 2 (1980), where Reeve played Clark Kent; this footage was released to the public as an extra feature on a special edition DVD release of the film in the early 2000s. Palance is notable for her role as an ill-destined young nanny in The Omen (1976), alongside Gregory Peck and Lee Remick. In 1979, after spending eight years working in England, Palance returned to her native United States.

In November 1979, Palance made her Broadway debut in the role of Allison St. James in Bernard Slade's Romantic Comedy, opposite Mia Farrow, Anthony Perkins, and Carole Cook. The production played at the Ethel Barrymore Theatre, the same theatre where both her parents served as understudies in the original Broadway production of A Streetcar Named Desire three decades earlier.

Palance co-hosted the television version of Ripley's Believe It or Not! with her father for two seasons in 1983 and 1984, replacing Jack's former co-host, Catherine Shirriff; Holly would later be replaced as co-host by singer Marie Osmond.

Palance had a leading role opposite Robin Williams and Kurt Russell in the comedy The Best of Times (1986), her final theatrical film. She appeared in the 1989 television film Cast the First Stone before formally retiring from acting.

After leaving acting, Palance began working as a journalist, heading the Santa Barbara Magazine, and later serving as the editor-in-chief of the Los Angeles Timess lifestyle magazine.

Personal life 
She married Tomorrow Never Dies director Roger Spottiswoode on April 9, 1983; they had two children and divorced in 1997. In 2010, Palance married journalist Robert Wallace.

Filmography

Film

Television

References

External links
 Official website
 
 
 

1950 births
Actresses from Los Angeles
American film actresses
American stage actresses
American people of Ukrainian descent
Television personalities from Los Angeles
American women television personalities
American women journalists
Journalists from California
Living people
20th-century American actresses
20th-century American journalists
21st-century American journalists
21st-century American actresses